Stephen Moore (born August 13, 1975, in Fort Worth, Texas) is a retired male  decathlete from the United States. He set his personal best (8085 points) at a meet in Arles, France, on June 7, 2004.

Achievements

External links

1975 births
Living people
American male decathletes
Athletes (track and field) at the 2003 Pan American Games
Sportspeople from Fort Worth, Texas
Pan American Games medalists in athletics (track and field)
Pan American Games gold medalists for the United States
Universiade medalists in athletics (track and field)
Universiade silver medalists for the United States
Medalists at the 1999 Summer Universiade
Medalists at the 2003 Pan American Games
20th-century American people
21st-century American people